The Jodhpur State Railway (JSR) was formed in 1924 and took over responsibility for working the Jodhpur section of the Jodhpur–Bikaner Railway, and the British section of the Jodhpur-Hyderabad Railway.

History

Predecessors
Earlier named the Jodhpur Railway the first section opened as a metre gauge line in 1882, later becoming the Jodhpur–Bikaner Railway (JBR) in 1889. In 1908 the JBR operated  in the territories of Sind (under British control) and the States of Jodhpur and Bikaner. A further  were sanctioned or under construction by JBR in 1918.

Creation of the Jodhpur State Railway 
In 1924, the JBR was divided into two new systems, the Jodhpur State Railway (JSR) and Bikaner State Railway (BSR) formed to take over responsibility for working the railway. The JSR taking the Jodhpur Section of the Jodhpur–Bikaner Railway, together with the Jodhpur-Hyderabad Railway (British Section). The exact mileage comprising the Jodhpur section is not known but in 1918 it was  plus  of the Jodhpur-Hyderabad Railway (British Section).

Writing critically in 1929 about third class travelling, Mahatma Gandhi condemned the latrines in JSR carriages as being "absolutely intolerable, insanitary and unfit for human use. The State railways should really be a model to the British system; whereas the actual state of things is the other way."

All these were metre gauge lines.

In 1947, the British section of the Jodhpur-Hyderabad Railway and the western portions of Jodhpur State Railway and Bikaner State Railway was ceded to the government of Pakistan becoming part of Pakistan Railways. The remaining portions of the Jodhpur State Railway and the Bikaner State Railway became part of the Northern Division of Indian Railways in 1952.

Rolling stock
In 1936, the company owned 107 locomotives, 243 coaches and 2611 goods wagons.

Classification
It was labeled as a Class I railway according to Indian Railway Classification System of 1926.

Conversion to broad gauge
The network was converted to   broad gauge progressively in 2000s and 2010s.

References 

Transport in Jodhpur
Defunct railway companies of India
Metre gauge railways in India
Rail transport in Rajasthan
History of Rajasthan